One Montgomery Tower (also known as Montgomery Tower and formerly Pacific Telesis Tower), part of the Post Montgomery Center complex, is an office skyscraper located at the northeast corner of Post and Kearny Streets in the financial district of San Francisco, California. The , 38-story tower was completed in 1982, and is connected to the Crocker Galleria mall. It houses around 2,500 office workers (as of 2019).

Despite the "One Montgomery" branding, the building's main entrance is on 120 Kearny Street, rather than on Montgomery Street. The building's structural steel columns are covered by a facade consisting of red granite and square tempered glass windows with aluminum frames, with small squares marking the intersections of each block of four windows (except for the first two floors, which use black granite and steel) .
The construction of the tower and Crocker Galleria in 1982 also involved the tearing down of the top ten floors of the adjacent Crocker Bank building on 1 Montgomery Street, with its new roof being converted into a privately-owned public open space (POPOS).

Notable tenants

 Since 2017, the Wikimedia Foundation has been headquartered on the sixteenth floor.
 A consulate general of the Netherlands
 The San Francisco office of the law firm Shook, Hardy, & Bacon
Stitch Fix
One of the first cashierless Amazon Go stores opened on the ground floor of One Montgomery Tower in January 2019.

See also
 
 List of tallest buildings in San Francisco

References

External links
 

Financial District, San Francisco
Office buildings completed in 1982
Skyscraper office buildings in San Francisco
Skidmore, Owings & Merrill buildings
1982 establishments in California
Leadership in Energy and Environmental Design gold certified buildings